Baron John Both de Bajna (? – 1493) was a Hungarian nobleman from the Both family, who served as, alongside Emeric Derencsényi, Ban of Croatia, Slavonia and Dalmatia in 1493. His brother, Andrew Both also acted as ban from 1504 to 1507. Lord of Sykava in 1492, John was killed in the siege of Brinje in 1493.

He married Apollonia Csapy, daughter of the nobleman Andrew Csapy, captain of the castle of Szentgyörgy in the Zala County between approx. 1441, and 1448. The familyname of Apollonia Csapy's mother is unknown, as in all the charts she appears only as "Helene". Apollonia's sister, Helen Csapy, married George Forster de Szenterzsébet. From John Both and Apollonia Csapy's union comes János Both of Bajna (†1521), Vice-Ban of Croatia, captain of the fortress of Belgrade (nándorfehérvári vicebáró); he is killed by the army of Suleiman the Magnificent  August 29, 1521.

References

1493 deaths
Bans of Croatia
Hungarian nobility
John
Year of birth unknown